Stephan Görgl (born 5 June 1978 in Bruck an der Mur) is a former Austrian alpine skier, who competed in Giant slalom and Super G.

He competed in the giant slalom at the 2006 Winter Olympics, but failed to finish his second run. He is the son of Anton and Traudl Hecher Görgl and the brother of Elisabeth Görgl who is also an alpine skier.

World Cup results

Podiums
 2 wins – (1 Giant slalom, 1 Super G)
 5 podiums – (3 GS, 2 SG)

Standings

References

1978 births
Austrian male alpine skiers
Olympic alpine skiers of Austria
People from Bruck an der Mur
Alpine skiers at the 2006 Winter Olympics
Living people
Sportspeople from Styria